Grevillea exposita is a species of flowering plant in the family Proteaceae and is endemic to the south-west of Western Australia. It is a dense, spreading shrub with mostly oblong to narrowly elliptic leaves and clusters of bright red and white flowers.

Description
The upper surface of the leaves is more or less glabrous with the edges rolled under, often obscuring most of the lower surface.

Taxonomy
Grevillea exposita was first formally described in 1994 by Peter M. Olde and Neil R. Marriott in The Grevillea Book from specimens collected by Olde near Eneabba in 1992. The specific epithet (exposita) means "exposed", referring to the lower leaf surface.

Distribution and habitat
This grevillea grows near creeks in the area between Eneabba, Arrino and Arrowsmith in the Geraldton Sandplains biogeographic region of south-western Western Australia.

Conservation status
Grevillea exposita is listed as "not threatened" by the Government of Western Australia Department of Biodiversity, Conservation and Attractions.

References

exposita
Proteales of Australia
Flora of Western Australia
Plants described in 1994